Dan Sullivan (born March 20, 1981) is a Canadian ice hockey player.

Career statistics

External links
 

1981 births
Living people
Augusta Lynx players
Baton Rouge Kingfish players
Canadian ice hockey right wingers
London Knights players
Louisiana IceGators (ECHL) players
Lowell Lock Monsters players
Mississauga IceDogs players
Owen Sound Attack players
Pensacola Ice Pilots players
People from York, Toronto
Reading Royals players
Roanoke Express players
Ice hockey people from Toronto